Pacitan Regency is a regency located in the southwestern corner of East Java Province, with Central Java Province on its western border. Located between 7.55° - 8.17°S and 110.55° - 111.25°E. The borders of Pacitan Regency are: Wonogiri Regency (Central Java) in the west, Ponorogo Regency and Trenggalek Regency in the east, and the Indian Ocean in the south. It covers an area of 1,389.87 km2 and had a population of 540,881 at the 2010 census and 586,110 at the 2020 census. The capital of Pacitan Regency is Pacitan town. The majority of citizens in Pacitan speak Javanese as their first language, while speaking Indonesian as a second language.

Geography

The area of Pacitan Regency is about 1,389.87 km2. Most of it is mountainous and rocky, also having a few rocky canyons. That sort of geography covers about 88% of the regency, and this is because Pacitan is located in the Thousand Mountains. The highest mountain in Pacitan is Mount Lima in Kebonagung, and Mount Gembes in Bandar as the spring of Grindulu River.

Comparison of land types:
Flat (0 - 5% slope) = 53.7 km2 (4%)
Bumpy (6 - 10% slope) = 134.24 km2 (10%)
Wavy (11 - 30% slope) = 322.18 km2 (24%)
Hilly (31 - 50% slope) = 698.06 km2 (52%)
Mountainous (more than 51% slope) = 134.24 km2 (10%)

Generally, the land in Pacitan can be divided into two categories, calcium rich in the south, and fertile land in the north. The land consists of lithosal association, red mediterranean lithosal, tuff and volcanic compound, reddish lithosal complex, and grey alluvial, clay sediments containing many potential minerals. The minerals are feldspar, ball clay, bentonite, pyrophyllite, calcite, gypsum, phosphate rock, quartz, coal, dolomite, gemstone, tin ore, and manganite.

Pacitan Regency includes 130.87 km2 of rice fields and 1,211.55 km2 of dry land. According to irrigation type the rice fields can be grouped into: technical irrigation rice field (16.06 km2), half technical irrigation rice field (11.88 km2), simple irrigation rice field (40.63 km2), and rain-dependent rice field (62.3 km2).

Administrative districts
Pacitan Regency is divided into twelve districts (kecamatan), tabulated below with their areas and population totals at the 2010 census and the 2020 census. The table also includes the location of the district headquarters, the number of administrative villages (rural desa and urban kelurahan) in each district, and its postal codes.

Beaches
Pacitan Regency has 17 beaches, to the west of Pacitan town: Banyu Tibo, Buyutan, Karang Bolong, Srau, Klayar, and Watu Karung, near Pacitan town: Pantai Teleng Ria, Tamperan Gung, Kali Uluh, and Wawaran, in the east of Pacitan City: Pidakan, Soge, Tawang, Taman, and Kunir. All beaches are near 70 kilometers of South Coast Road from Wonogiri Regency to Trenggalek Regency. Soge Beach can be accessed in 30 minutes drive or by bus public transport from Pacitan town, but all beaches are relatively far from big cities such as Surabaya (7 hours) and Surakarta (4 hours), but it is closer from Yogyakarta.

Tourism 
Pacitan town is known as the City of Tourism (Kota Parawisata) or City of a Thousand Caves (Kota Seribu Goa) because of ecological diversity and natural attractions. Pacitan features cave tours, surfing, hiking, historical places, natural springs and sports arena (still in progress) that can be the options to be visited.
Pacitan provides some natural caves, those are Goa Gong (Gong Cave) which is the most beautiful cave in Southeast Asia, Goa Kalak (Kalak Cave) where Soeharto (the second president of Indonesia) did meditation here, Goa Tabuhan (Tabuhan Cave) where Alibasyha Sentot Prawirodirjo did meditation, and Goa Luweng Jaran (Luweng Jaran Cave) where the stalactites and stalagmites in this cave produces sounds like Gamelan (Javanese Original Music Instrumens).
The beaches in Pacitan has their own typical character. Watu Karung Beach, Klayar Beach, Srau Beach, and Kasap Beach have white sand and beautiful coral reefs. Teleng Ria Beach is located at the heart of Pacitan city where makes it easy to reach, Soge Beach has amazing bridge, Taman Beach has turtle conservation, Sidomulyo Beach has the longest flying fox (zip line) in Indonesia, Banyu Tibo beach has a small waterfall that its water directly flow to the sea through its shore and any other beaches with its own uniqueness.

Notable people
Pacitan is also the birthplace of the former army general and the former and first directly elected president of Indonesia, Susilo Bambang Yudhoyono.

References